Atrytonopsis pittacus, the white-barred skipper, is a species of grass skipper in the family Hesperiidae. It was described by William Henry Edwards in 1882 and is found in Central and North America.

The MONA or Hodges number for Atrytonopsis pittacus is 4085.

References

 Hodges, Ronald W.; et al., eds. (1983). Check List of the Lepidoptera of America North of Mexico, xxiv + 284.
 Opler, Paul A. (1999). A Field Guide to Western Butterflies, Second Edition, xiv + 540.
 Pelham, Jonathan P. (2008). "A catalogue of the butterflies of the United States and Canada with a complete bibliography of the descriptive and systematic literature". Journal of Research on the Lepidoptera. vol. 40, xiv + 658.

Further reading

 Arnett, Ross H. (2000). American Insects: A Handbook of the Insects of America North of Mexico. CRC Press.

Hesperiinae